Interlude is an album by Saint Etienne.  Released by Sub Pop in the US and Mantra (under licence from Sub Pop) in Canada, this 2001 collection featured UK b-sides and extra songs left over from the recording sessions for their 2000 album, Sound of Water.

The album was released on CD and vinyl formats. The vinyl version includes 10 tracks, and a limited edition orange vinyl version was released.

The CD release featured two "bonus beats". The first is the single mix of "Boy Is Crying" done by Welsh dance act Hybrid; the second is the Trouser Enthusiast remix of "Lose That Girl", which was prepared for the track's (eventually shelved) single release.

The b-side tracks are also available on the Sound of Water 2009 reissue bonus disc, while the other tracks are also available on the Finisterre 2010 reissue bonus disc.

Track listing

The U.S. release of the CD also includes the short and long edits of the "How We Used to Live" music video; the Canadian release does not.

 Tracks 1 and 5 are B-sides to "How We Used To Live"
 Tracks 2 and 6 are B-sides to "Boy Is Crying"
 Tracks 8 and 10 are B-sides to "Heart Failed (In The Back Of A Taxi)"
 Track 4 is taken from Caroline Now!, a tribute album of songs by The Beach Boys and Brian Wilson.

References

B-side compilation albums
Saint Etienne (band) compilation albums
2001 compilation albums
Sub Pop compilation albums